Kiyo*Sen is the name of a Japanese fusion jazz duo created in 2013 with a core collaboration between Kiyomi Otaka, the keyboard player of Japanese fusion group Casiopea 3rd and the Japanese drummer Senri Kawaguchi often accompanied by guest artists playing guitar and bass guitar. To date, they have released 5 CDs: Chocolate Booster, Duology, Trick or Treat;, Organiser and Drumatica and one DVD Chocco Boo Live!. They have also toured a number of venues in Japan.

References

Japanese jazz ensembles